The Morocco national football team, nicknamed "the Atlas Lions", represents Morocco in men's international football competitions. It is controlled by the Royal Moroccan Football Federation, also known as FRMF. The team's colours are red and green. The team is a member of both FIFA and the Confederation of African Football (CAF).

Internationally, Morocco won the 1976 African Cup of Nations, two African Nations Championships, and a FIFA Arab Cup. They have participated in the FIFA World Cup six times. They made history in 1986, when they became the first African team to finish top of a group at a World Cup and the first to reach knockout stages. However, they lost to eventual runners-up West Germany 1–0.

Morocco defied all expectations at the 2022 FIFA World Cup, topping their group containing previous runners-up Croatia, and defeating high ranking teams such as Belgium, Spain, and Portugal. They thus became the first African nation to ever reach the semi-finals and the third ever semi-finalist not from UEFA or CONMEBOL (after the United States in 1930 and South Korea in 2002). They were knocked out by defending champions and eventual runners-up France, and placed fourth, their highest ever finish.

The Atlas Lions were ranked 10th in the FIFA World Rankings in April 1998. They were ranked by FIFA as the top African national team for three consecutive years, from 1997 to 1999. As of December 2022, Morocco is ranked as the 11th best national team in the world.

History

Pre-independence period

The Moroccan national team was founded in 1928 and played its first game on 22 December of that year against the B team of France, to whom it lost 2–1. This team, formed by the best footballers of the LMFA or the Moroccan Football League (settlers or natives), was active in friendly matches against other North African teams such as those of Algeria and Tunisia. These associations of settler clubs and local footballers, in addition to having their own championship, clashed with each other in a tournament that Morocco won several times, such as in 1948–1949.

The LMFA also faced some club teams such as NK Lokomotiva Zagreb in January 1950, as well as France A and France B. Against France A the LMFA made a 1–1 draw in Casablanca in 1941.

On 9 September 1954, an earthquake struck the Algerian region of Orléansville (now Chlef) and caused the destruction of the city and the death of over 1,400 people. On 7 October 1954, the French Football Association and the Maghreb inhabitants organized a charity match to raise funds for the families of the victims of the catastrophic event. In the match, held at the Parc de Princes in Paris, a team made up of Moroccans, Algerians and Tunisians played against the national team of France. Led by star Larbi Benbarek, the Maghreb selection managed to win 3–2, a month before the Toussaint Rouge attacks by the Algerian National Liberation Front which marked the beginning of the Algerian War.

The beginnings of Morocco (1955–1963)

In 1955, the Royal Moroccan Football Federation was established, at the end of the French protectorate of Morocco, which had lasted since 1912.

On 19 October 1957, at the 2nd edition of the Pan Arab Games in Lebanon, Morocco made its debut as an independent country against Iraq, at the Camille Chamoun Sports City Stadium, and drew 3–3. At the tournament, Morocco took the first win in its history against Libya, winning 5–1, then beat Tunisia 3–1 to reach the semi-finals. After a 1–1 draw with Syria, lots were drawn to decide who would progress to the final, and Syria were selected at Morocco's expense. Morocco withdrew from the third-place play-off against Lebanon and finished fourth overall.

Between 1957 and 1958, Morocco held numerous friendly matches against the National Liberation Front team, the representative of Algeria before its independence in 1958. In 1959, the team took part for the first time in an international competition, the qualifying rounds of the 1960 Rome Olympics. Drawn into a group with Tunisia and Malta, Morocco finished second on goal difference and failed to progress. That same year, the football federation of Morocco joined FIFA.

In 1960, Morocco competed in World Cup qualification for the first time. Drawn against Tunisia in the first round, Morocco won the first leg 2–1, while Tunisia won the second leg 2–1. A play-off held in Palermo, Italy also finished in a tie, so a coin toss was used to determine who progressed. Morocco won the toss, and beat Ghana 1–0 on aggregate to reach the inter-continental play-offs. Drawn against Spain, Morocco lost 4–2 on aggregate and thus failed to qualify.

In 1961, Morocco held the Pan-Arab Games and won the football tournament, winning all five of their matches. Their third match, against Saudi Arabia, resulted in Morocco's biggest-ever victory, winning 13–1. They also claimed their first two wins against a European team, beating East Germany 2–1 and 2–0.

In 1963, the Moroccan team came close to qualifying for the African Cup of Nations. In the decisive play-off against Tunisia, they were defeated 4–1 in Tunis and won 4–2 at home, they were therefore eliminated. At the Mediterranean Games in Naples 1963, they finished fourth after a 2–1 defeat in the final for third place against Spain's reserve team.

First appearances in international competitions (1963–1976)

Morocco participated for the first time in the final phase of an international competition at the 1964 Tokyo Olympics. Having qualified under the leadership of manager Mohamed Massoun, the Moroccans were included in a group of three teams due to the withdrawal of North Korea. Morocco lost both their matches, against Hungary (6–0, the team's worst-ever defeat) and Yugoslavia (3–1, despite taking the lead in the second minute via Ali Bouachra).

In 1966, the Moroccan Football Association joined the Confederation of African Football and was able to participate in the competitions organized by the CAF.

During qualifying for the 1968 Olympics, Morocco refused to play against Israel, and were eventually replaced by Ghana.

In 1968 and 1969, the team was engaged in qualifying for the 1970 World Cup in Mexico. Their debut eliminated Senegal (1–0) and Tunisia after a draw. In the final round of the preliminaries, against Sudan and Nigeria, Morocco obtained five points, finishing ahead of Nigeria and qualifying for the first time for the final round of a world championship. Shortly after, Morocco lost the decisive play-off against Algeria to enter the final stage of the 1970 Africa Cup of Nations.

Morocco thus became the first African national team to qualify for a world championship after having played in an elimination tournament. The Moroccan team, coached by the Yugoslav Blagoje Vidinić, consisted entirely of players in the Moroccan league, including Driss Bamous and Ahmed Faras.

On 3 June 1970, against West Germany, Morocco surprisingly opened the scoring with a goal in the twenty-first minute of the game scored by Houmane Jarir. In the second half, however, the West Germans scored with Uwe Seeler and Gerd Müller and won by 2–1. The Lions of the Atlas then played against Peru. This time the Moroccans conceded three goals in ten minutes to lose 3–0. On 11 June 1970, the eliminated Moroccans drew with Bulgaria 1–1, with a comeback goal in the sixtieth game of Maouhoub Ghazouani. It was the first point obtained by an African national team at the World Cup.

In the 1972 Africa Cup of Nations qualification, the Lions of the Atlas ousted Algeria, then they faced Egypt, beating them 3–0 in the first leg and suffering a 3–2 defeat on the way back, yet they qualified for the first time for the final phase of the continental tournament. In the group stage, they accumulated three 1–1 draws against Congo, Sudan and Zaire and were eliminated in the first round. All three Moroccan goals were by Ahmed Faras.

Qualifying for the 1972 Olympics with two wins and two draws, Morocco debuted in Group A with a goalless draw against the United States, then lost 3–0 against hosts West Germany and defeated Malaysia 6–0 with a Faras hat-trick, thereby advancing to the second round. Due to defeats against USSR (3–0), Denmark (3–1) and Poland (5–0), they were eliminated from the tournament; finishing bottom of their group. To date, this result remains the best performance of the Atlas Lions at the Olympic football tournament.

In the 1974 world cup qualifiers, Morocco successfully passed three qualifying rounds before entering the final round alongside Zambia and Zaire. Losing 4–0 away against Zambia, the Moroccans bounced back in the second game, defeating the same opponent 2–0 at home. They then went to Zaire for their third game but lost 3–0, conceding all three goals in the second half, with Faras leaving the field due to injury. Morocco filed an appeal, trying to get the match to be replayed; it was dismissed by FIFA. In protest, Morocco withdrew from the qualifiers causing the Atlas Lions to miss their final game at home against Zaire which had already qualified for the finals, with FIFA awarding Zaire a 2–0 win on walkover. For the same reason, Morocco also decided not to take part in the 1974 African Cup of Nations qualification.

In 1974, Morocco played only two games, both against Algeria, achieving a 2–0 win and a 0–0 draw. Morocco then resumed its regular FIFA and CAF competitions, qualifying for the 1976 Africa Cup of Nations by eliminating Ghana in the last round, but failed to qualify for the 1976 Olympics, being eliminated by Nigeria.

Between successes and defeats (1976–1986)
Morocco, coached by the Romanian Virgil Mărdărescu and captained by Faras, took the continental throne at 1976 African Cup of Nations, in his second participation in the competition. Ahmed Makrouh scored the goal of the final match to equalize at 1–1, which gave Morocco the first, and to date, only cup in its history.

After failing to qualify for the 1974 FIFA World Cup, they also did not make 1978 and 1982. At the 1978 Africa Cup of Nations, they were eliminated in the first round, while at the 1980 Africa Cup of Nations they won third place, beating Egypt 2–0. They then won the 1983 Mediterranean Games, played at home, thanks to a 3–0 success in the final against Turkey B.

Morocco did not qualify for either the 1982 or 1984 Africa Cup of Nations. At the 1986 Africa Cup of Nations, they finished fourth, beaten 3–2 in the consolation final by the Ivory Coast.

Golden Generation (1986–2000)

Morocco qualified for the 1986 FIFA World Cup which took place in Mexico, and surprisingly won a group with Portugal, England and Poland, thanks to two draws against the English and Polish and a 3–1 win against the Portuguese. However, they were narrowly eliminated by West Germany in the first knockout round, thanks to a goal from Lothar Matthäus one minute from the end of regulation time. Morocco became the first African and Arab national team to have passed the first round of the World Cup.

Two years later, the Moroccan team presented itself at the 1988 African Cup of Nations as a host country with high expectations. After winning the first round, they were eliminated in the semifinals by Cameroon and finished in fourth place after losing the consolation final against Algeria (1–1 after extra time and 4–3 after the penalty shots).

Failure to qualify for the 1990 FIFA World Cup opened a period of crisis. In the 1992 African Cup of Nations, the team was eliminated in the first round. They then did not participate in the 1994 or 1996 African Cup tournaments. They, however, did qualify for the 1994 World Cup in the United States and the 1998 tournament in France.

At the 1998 Africa Cup of Nations, after winning their group, Morocco were defeated and eliminated from South Africa (2–1).

Difficult years (2006–2017)
Morocco took part in the 2004 African Cup of Nations, drawn into Group D defeating Nigeria 1–0, defeating Benin 4–0 and drawing 1–1 with South Africa. Morocco qualified to the knockout stages, facing Algeria; they eventually won 3–1 in extra time, and 4–0 against Mali in the semi-final. They lost the 2004 African Cup of Nations Final against Tunisia 2–1.

In 2012, the national team won the Arab Cup, topping their group, defeating Iraq in the semi-final and Libya in the final.

In 2014, Morocco participated for the first time in the African Nations Championship after failing to qualify in the 2009 and 2011 editions. led by coach Hassan Benabicha, Morocco did not make it past the second round after losing 3–4 to Nigeria in the Quarter-finals. They managed to qualify for the 2016 African Nations Championship, but were eliminated in the group stages.

Morocco hosted the 2018 African Nations Championship, which included a victory for the home nation, the third North African country to win the competition's title.

Second Golden Generation (2017–present)

Morocco returned to the World Cup after a 20-year absence in 2018. The North Africans were drawn in Group B with World Cup favourites Spain, Portugal, and Iran. In their opening game against Iran, Morocco showed full dedication but lost 10 in the final minutes of the match, scored by an own goal. In their second game, Morocco faced Portugal but ended losing 1–0 by a goal scored by Cristiano Ronaldo. In the last match against Spain they took the lead 2–1 but was unable to keep it, and drew 2–2, scored by Khalid Boutaïb and Youssef En-Nesyri.

Morocco entered the 2019 AFCON with high confidence and players claiming them to be the favourites to win. However, in spite of three straight group stage wins, Morocco were shockingly knocked out by Benin in the round of sixteen.

At the 2020 African Nations Championship in Cameroon, Morocco won their second CHAN title, in its second consecutive final appearance. Captained by Ayoub El Kaabi, they defeated Togo (1–0), Rwanda (0–0), the Uganda (5–2), Zambia (3–1), and Cameroon (4–0) on the way to a final against Mali in Yaoundé. Morocco won 2–0, with both goals scored late into the second half by Soufiane Bouftini and Ayoub El Kaabi. Morocco thus became the first team to win back-to-back titles. Soufiane Rahimi went on to be named Total Man of the tournament after an astonishing performance scoring a total of 5 goals.

In December 2021, Morocco started its venture at the 2021 FIFA Arab Cup's Group C, along with Jordan, Palestine and Saudi Arabia. Morocco opened the tournament with a 4–0 win against Palestine, Morocco then managed to overcome a highly defensive Jordan with another 4–0 triumph, They won their final match in a 1–0 victory against Saudi Arabia. they were eliminated in the quarter-final after penalty-shootout against Algeria.

After easily topping their 2021 Africa Cup of Nations qualification group which consisted of Mauritania, Burundi, and Central African Republic, Morocco were one of the favorites to win the 2021 edition of the tournament hosted in Cameroon. Morocco were drawn into group E that included Gabon, Ghana and Comoros. Morocco won its first game against Ghana scored by Sofiane Boufal in the final minutes of the game. In their second game against Comoros, they claimed a 2–0 victory. Their final match against Gabon ended in a draw, making Morocco reach the round of 16 after ending up first in the group. They defeated Malawi 2–1 in the round of 16. They were eliminated in the quarter-final after a 2–1 loss against Egypt.

After qualifying for the 2022 FIFA World Cup by winning the CAF Third Round African Qualifiers, the team was drawn in Group F along with Croatia, Belgium, and Canada. Morocco were not expected to qualify, but after holding previous runners-up Croatia to a 0–0 draw and shocking previous third place Belgium 2–0, a 2–1 win over Canada meant they finished top of the group and advanced to the round of 16 for the first time since 1986. There, they met Spain, drawing 0–0 to force a penalty shoot-out. Goalkeeper Yassine Bounou saved two penalties, and Achraf Hakimi scored the decisive penalty with a panenka for Morocco to advance to the quarter-finals for the first time. They advanced further to the semi-finals winning against favourite Portugal, 1–0 . The Moroccan forward Youssef En-Nesyri leapt to 2.78m (9ft1) to score a header that was the match-winning goal. That made Morocco the first African and Arab team to qualify for the semi-finals.

However, they lost to France in the semi-final 2–0 on 14 December at the Al Bayt Stadium in Al Khor, putting an end to Morocco's dream run. They played Croatia for third place on 17 December at the Khalifa International Stadium in Ar-Rayyan, a rematch of the earlier group stage meeting. They lost 2–1 to the latter, and ended their World Cup campaign at fourth place. The team would go on to donate their entire World Cup earnings from the tournament to charities within Morocco that help with poverty that affects children and families in the country.

Home stadium
At the time of the Cherifian Empire, the Philip stadium was the largest Moroccan stadium. Its capacity was 25,000 seats. After the country's independence, the latter changed its name to the Stade d'honneur de Casablanca (nicknamed "Donor" by the people of Casablanca). The stadium will mainly be used by the Moroccan team as well as by the two main clubs of Casablanca: Wydad AC and Raja CA. The stadium then underwent a major renovation in order to be able to host the 1983 Mediterranean Games in Casablanca towards the end of the 1970s. It reopened in 1983 under its current name, Stade Mohammed V, and then had 80,000 seats before being limited to 67,000 seats following a new renovation in view of Morocco's bid to host the World Cup in 2000. Between 2016 and 2019, the Mohammed V stadium underwent major renovation and modernization works. Its capacity was reduced again and today the stadium has 45,891 all-seated capacity.

The Grand Complex of Rabat was inaugurated in 1983 under the name of Prince Moulay Abdellah Stadium. The national team also plays several matches there. The Rabat stadium could then accommodate 65,000 spectators but it was mainly used by the two local teams of Far Rabat and FUS Rabat. Its capacity was reduced to 53,000 seats in 2000 and then to 45,800 seats in 2020. It is currently the stadium of Morocco's national football team.

From 2011, the Atlas Lions played most of their matches in the new Marrakesh Stadium, which has a capacity of 45,240 seats. The latter is considered to bring luck to the Moroccan team, which won several important matches there in front of a large audience, notably beating Algeria for the qualifications for the 2012 Africa Cup of Nations football by 4–0, and Tanzania by 3–1 allowing Morocco the qualification, then another important meeting against Mozambique ending in a crushing victory on the score of 4–0, allowing this time, the qualification for the 2013 Africa Cup of Nations.

During the period of coach Badou Ezzaki between 2014 and 2016, the Moroccan national team played most of its matches at the Adrar stadium in Agadir, which has a capacity of 45,480, and also a friendly match was played in it during the period of Hervé Renard between Morocco and the Netherlands in 2017, and it is considered the most prominent match for Morocco that was played in this stadium.

Morocco also has other large stadiums built in the 2000s such as the one in Fez Stadium which has 45,000 seats and which hosts the two clubs of the city: MAS Fez and Wydad de Fès.

Kit suppliers

Morocco's home colours are most red shirts and green shorts and socks, away colours are usually all white or all green.

Results and fixtures

The following is a list of match results in the last 12 months, as well as any future matches that have been scheduled.

2022

2023

Coaching staff

Coaching history

Players

Current squad
The following players were called up for the friendlies against Brazil and Peru on 25 and 28 March, respectively.

Caps and goals are correct as of 17 December 2022, after the match against Croatia.

Recent call-ups
The following players have been called up for the team in the last 12 months.

 INJ

 INJ

 INJ

 INJ

DEC Player declined the call-up to the squad
INJ Did not make it to the current squad due to injury
PRE Preliminary squad / standby
RET Player retired from internationals
SUS Player is suspended
WD Player withdrew from the roster for non-injury related reasons

Previous squads

Player records

Players in bold are still active with Morocco.

Most appearances

Top goalscorers

Competitive record

FIFA World Cup

Morocco's national football team has participated six times in the FIFA World Cup. Their best performance was in the 2022 FIFA World Cup where they finished in fourth place, becoming both the first African and Arab nation to reach the semi-finals of the tournament.

Africa Cup of Nations

{| class="wikitable" style="font-size:90%; text-align:center"
|-
! colspan="9" style="color:white; background:#ED1C24;" |Africa Cup of Nations record
! style="width:1%;background:white" rowspan="38"|
! colspan="6" style="color:white; background:#ED1C24;" |Qualification record
|-
!Year
!Round
!Position
!
!
!*
!
!
!
!
!
!
!
!
!
|-
| 1957||colspan=8 rowspan=2|Not affiliated to CAF
|colspan=6 rowspan=2|Not affiliated to CAF
|-
| 1959
|-
| 1962||colspan=8|Withdrew
|colspan=6|Withdrew
|-
| 1963||colspan=8|Did not qualify
|2
|1
|0
|1
|5
|6
|-
| 1965||colspan=8 rowspan=2|Did not enter
|colspan=6 rowspan=2|Did not enter
|-
| 1968
|-
| 1970||colspan=8|Did not qualify
|2
|1
|0
|1
|1
|2
|-
| 1972||Group stage||5th||3||0||3||0||3||3
|4
|2
|0
|2
|9
|6
|-
| 1974||colspan=8|Did not enter
|colspan=6|Did not enter
|-style="background:Gold;"
| 1976||Champions||1st||6||4||2||0||11||6
|6
|4
|0
|2
|13
|4
|-
| 1978||Group stage||6th||3||1||1||1||2||4
|colspan=6|Qualified as defending champions
|- style="background:#c96;"
| 1980||Third place||3rd||5||2||1||2||4||3
|4
|2
|1
|1
|14
|5
|-
| 1982||colspan=8 rowspan=2|Did not qualify
|4
|3
|0
|1
|8
|4
|-
| 1984
|4
|1
|2
|1
|4
|2
|- style="background:#9acdff;"
| 1986||Fourth place||4th||5||1||2||2||4||5|2
|1
|1
|0
|1
|0
|- style="background:#9acdff;"
|style="border: 3px solid red"| 1988||Fourth place||4th||5||1||3||1||3||3|colspan=6|Qualified as hosts
|-
| 1990||colspan=8|Did not qualify
|2
|0
|2
|0
|1
|1
|-
| 1992||Group stage||9th||2||0||1||1||1||2
|6
|4
|0
|2
|11
|4
|-
| 1994||colspan=8 rowspan=2|Did not qualify
|6
|2
|2
|2
|5
|4
|-
| 1996
|4
|1
|1
|2
|2
|4
|-
| 1998||Quarter-finals||6th||4||2||1||1||6||3
|6
|4
|2
|0
|10
|1
|-
|  2000
|rowspan=2|Group stage
||11th
||3
||1
||1
||1
||1
||2
|4
|2
|2
|0
|6
|4
|-
| 2002
||9th
||3
||1
||1
||1
||3
||4
|6
|3
|1
|2
|5
|4
|- style="background:silver;"
| 2004||Runners-up||2nd||6||4||1||1||14||4|6
|5
|1
|0
|10
|0
|-
| 2006
|rowspan=2|Group stage
|13th
|3
|0
|2
|1
|0
|1
|10
|5
|5
|0
|17
|7
|-
| 2008
|11th
|3
|1
|0
|2
|7
|6
|4
|3
|1
|0
|6
|1
|-
| 2010||colspan=8|Did not qualify
|10
|3
|3
|4
|14
|13
|-
|  2012
|rowspan=2|Group stage
|12th
|3
|1
|0
|2
|4
|5
|6
|3
|2
|1
|8
|2
|-
| 2013
||10th||3||0||3||0||3||3
|2
|1
|0
|1
|4
|2
|-
| 2015||colspan=8|Disqualified
|colspan=6|Originally qualified as hosts, then disqualified
|-
|  2017||Quarter-finals||7th||4||2||0||2||4||3
|6
|5
|1
|0
|10
|1
|-
| 2019||Round of 16||9th||4||3||1||0||4||1
|6
|3
|2
|1
|8
|3
|-
| 2021||Quarter-finals||5th||5||3||1||1||8||5
|6
|4
|2
|0
|10
|1
|-
| 2023
|colspan=8 rowspan=1|To be determined
| colspan="6" rowspan="1" |To be determined
|-
| 2025
| colspan="8" rowspan="1" |To be determined
| colspan="6" rowspan="1" |To be determined
|-
! style="background:#E70013; color:white;" |Total
! style="background:#E70013; color:white;" |1 Title
! style="background:#E70013; color:white;" |18/33
! style="background:#E70013; color:white;" |70
! style="background:#E70013; color:white;" |27
! style="background:#E70013; color:white;" |24
! style="background:#E70013; color:white;" |19
! style="background:#E70013; color:white;" |82
! style="background:#E70013; color:white;" |63
! style="background:#E70013; color:white;" |118
! style="background:#E70013; color:white;" |63
! style="background:#E70013; color:white;" |31
! style="background:#E70013; color:white;" |24
! style="background:#E70013; color:white;" |182
! style="background:#E70013; color:white;" |81
|}

African Nations Championship

Olympic games

 Football at the Summer Olympics has been an under-23 tournament since the 1992 edition.

All-Africa Games

 Prior to the Cairo 1991 campaign, the Football at the All-Africa Games was open to full senior national teams.

Mediterranean Games
1951 to 1987 senior teams, from 1991 youth teams.

Pan Arab Games

FIFA Arab Cup

Minor tournaments

Head-to-head performance
Correct as of 17 December 2022.

Notes

Honours

 Major competitions FIFA World Cup Fourth place: 2022

 Africa Cup of Nations  Champions: 1976
  Runner-up: 2004
  Third-place: 1980
 Fourth-place: 1986, 1988African Nations Championship  Champions: 2018, 2020FIFA Arab Cup  Champions: 2012
  Troisième: 2002Pan Arab Games  Gold Medal: 1961, 1976
  Silver Medal: 1985Mediterranean Games   Gold Medal: 1983, 2013
  Bronze Medal: 1991, 2018, 2022Islamic Solidarity Games  Gold Medal: 2013
  Silver Medal: 2005

 Friendly tournaments Jeux de la Francophonie  Gold Medal: 2001, 2017
  Silver Medal: 1989, 2013
  Bronze Medal: 2009Kuneitra Cup  Gold Medal: 1974Nehru Cup  Bronze Medal: 1985

Friendly competitionsLG Cup  Runners-up: 1999
  Third place: 2002, 2002, 2011World Military Cup  Runner-up: 1966, 1989, 1993
 Third place: 1965, 1967

AwardsAfrican National Team of the Year First place : 1985, 1986, 1997, 2022
 Second place : 1993, 1998, 2003, 2004
 Third place : 1980FIFA Best Mover of the Year'''
 First place : 2022
 Third place : 1993

Orders and decorations
: 
 Officers of the Order of the Throne (20 December 2022)

See also
 Cultural significance of the Atlas lion
 Morocco A' national football team
 Morocco national under-23 football team
 Morocco national under-20 football team
 Morocco national under-17 football team
 Morocco women's national football team
 List of Morocco football players in foreign leagues
 Morocco national football team records and statistics

Other football codes
 Morocco national futsal team
 Morocco national beach soccer team

Notes

References

External links

Official website of Morocco's FA 
FIFA profile
RSSSF archive of results

 
African national association football teams
M